Leonardo Pettinari may refer to:
Leonardo Pettinari (rower) (born 1973), Italian Olympic silver medalist
Leonardo Pettinari (footballer) (born 1986), Italian footballer

See also
Pettinari